A Ticket in Tatts is a 1911 Australian silent film directed by Gaston Mervale.

Plot
John Hare (A.J. Patrick) loses his job after going to the races at work without permission. Despite being married with a child he invests his last shilling in a Tattersall's sweep ticket and draws the favourite. He interviews Dick Fallows (Alf Scarlett), the owner of the favourite, and puts two-thirds of the sweep money with him. The horse wins and after Hare secures the prize money he goes to the Fallows house to celebrate, where he meets Mrs Fallows (Louise Carbasse), Fred Wynne (Godfrey Cass) and some others. Hare plays cards and gets drunk, falling asleep on the couch in the room. A quarrel results between Fallows and Wynne; Fallows winds up killing Wynne with a knife, and then puts the knife in Hare's hand.

Hare wakes up, sees the knife and Wynne's corpse and thinks he might have done the murder. Fallows confirms this was the case and suggest he tell his wife (Harrie Ireland) and leave town. Hare does this. Mrs Fallows starts to follow her husband around town and discovers him with another woman. Fallows knocks her down and is about to kill when stopped by the occupants by a passing tram.

Hare is tormented by dreams of his wife and child and decides to give himself up so he can see them again. He is arrested by the injured Mrs Fallows, believing herself near death, confesses that Hare was innocent and her husband murdered Wynne. Fallows is arrested while Hare is released, gets his old job back and returns to his family.

Reception
The film appears to have been well received by the public and critics. When it screened in Adelaide in a rented hall owned by the YMCA, the YMCA ordered removal of a poster advertising it on the grounds that it could be seen to promote gambling.

Cast
A.J. Patrick as John Hare
Alf Scarlett as Dick Fallows
Godfrey Cass as Fred Wynne
James Martin as clergyman
Louise Carbasse as Mrs Fallows
Harrie Ireland as Mrs Hare
Harry Beaumont

References

External links

A Ticket in Tatts at National Film and Sound Archive

1911 films
Australian drama films
Australian black-and-white films
Australian silent short films
1911 drama films
1911 short films
Films directed by Gaston Mervale
Silent drama films